David Oliver McCormick (July 10, 1943 – March 17, 1986) was a professional American football player who played tackle in the National Football League (NFL). He played in the NFL for two seasons, one each with the San Francisco 49ers and the New Orleans Saints, the latter of which he was a part of their inaugural season roster. He played in a total of 16 games: 14 with the 49ers and two with the Saints.

McCormick was born in Winnsboro, Louisiana and attended Rayville High School in Rayville, Louisiana. He attended Louisiana State University, where he played college football for the LSU Tigers football team. In 1965, he was selected as a first-team All-Southeastern Conference player by the Associated Press and UPI.

References

External links

1943 births
1986 deaths
American football tackles
LSU Tigers football players
San Francisco 49ers players
New Orleans Saints players
Players of American football from Louisiana
People from Winnsboro, Louisiana